Artematopodidae is a family of soft-bodied plant beetles in the superfamily Elateroidea. They are mostly found in understory forest foliage. The life history of the group is obscure, larvae of the genera Eurypogon and Macropogon likely feed on moss, while the larvae of Artematopus have been fed insect remains.The oldest fossils of the family date to the Middle Jurassic.

Genera
 Allopogonia Cockerell, 1906
 Artematopus Perty, 1830
 Brevipogon Lawrence, 2005
 Carcinognathus Kirsch, 1873
 Ctesibius Champion, 1897
 Electribius Crowson, 1973
 Eurypogon Motschulsky, 1859
 Macropogon Motschulsky, 1859

Extinct genera 

 Cretobrevipogon Cai et al, 2020 Yixian Formation, China, Early Cretaceous (Aptian)
 Sinobrevipogon Cai et al, 2015 Daohugou Beds, China, Middle Jurassic (Callovian)
 Bipogonia Li et al, 2022 Burmese amber, Myanmar, Late Cretaceous (Cenomanian)
 Carinibipogonia Li et al, 2022 Burmese amber, Myanmar, Late Cretaceous (Cenomanian)
 Forticatinius Tan & Ren, 2007 Yixian Formation, China, Early Cretaceous (Aptian)

References

Further reading

 
 
 
 
 
 
 
 
 
 
 

Elateroidea
Beetle families